The 1984 CONMEBOL Pre-Olympic Tournament began on 8 February and ended on 21 February 1984 and was the 7th CONMEBOL Pre-Olympic Tournament. Argentina, Bolivia, Peru, and Uruguay did not participate. Brazil and Chile qualified for the 1984 Summer Olympics.

Group stage

Group 1

Peru were drawn into Group 1 but withdrew.

Group 2

Argentina were drawn into Group 2 but withdrew.

Final round

References 

CONMEBOL Pre-Olympic Tournament
Olympic